Lou Rosselli (born July 13, 1970) is an American former wrestler. He competed in the men's freestyle 52 kg at the 1996 Summer Olympics. Since 2016, he has been the head wrestling coach at the University of Oklahoma. Before his time with the Sooners, Rosselli was an associate head coach at Ohio State University.

Wrestling career
Rosselli attended Royalton-Hartland High School in Middleport, New York, where he was a four-time state qualifier and two-time NYSPHSAA champion. In 1986 he won the title in the 96 pound weight class, two years later he won his second title at 112 pounds. After 5 years of varsity wrestling, Rosselli continued his career at Edinboro University of Pennsylvania, where he saw continued success. He won the PSAC championship in the 118-pound weight class three times, additionally qualifying for the NCAA Division I Wrestling Championships each year from 1989 to 1991. Post-college, Rosselli won the U.S. Open championship in 1995, 1996, and 1999. He also qualified and competed in the 1996 Summer Olympics in Atlanta, Georgia. Here he won matches against Amiran Kardanov of Greece and Constantin Corduneanu of Romania. He was forced to withdraw from the tournament in the fourth round after breaking his arm in the match against Corduneanu.

References

External links
 

1970 births
Living people
American male sport wrestlers
Olympic wrestlers of the United States
Wrestlers at the 1996 Summer Olympics
Sportspeople from New York City